Lullington Heath is a  biological Site of Special Scientific Interest west of Eastbourne in East Sussex. It is a national nature reserve and a Nature Conservation Review site, Grade I.

This site has two nationally uncommon habitats, chalk heath and chalk grassland. Chalk heath formerly covered most of the site but scrub took over much of it after myxomatosis almost wiped out the rabbit population in the 1950s. The grassland is rich in flowering plants and the scrub and rough grassland provide valuable habitats for invertebrates and birds.

References

Sites of Special Scientific Interest in East Sussex
National nature reserves in England
Nature Conservation Review sites